Ismael Kurtz is a Brazilian football manager active primarily in Africa.

Career
Kurtz managed the Ghana national team at the 1996 African Cup of Nations, before being appointed manager of Angola in March 2002.

References

Year of birth missing (living people)
Living people
Brazilian football managers
Expatriate football managers in Angola
Expatriate football managers in Ghana
Fluminense FC managers
Ghana national football team managers
Angola national football team managers
1996 African Cup of Nations managers
Brazilian expatriate sportspeople in Angola
Brazilian expatriate sportspeople in Ghana